Titikaveka F.C. is a Cook Islands football club located in Avarua, Cook Islands. It currently plays in Cook Islands Round Cup which is the name for its main football league competition, they have won 14 league titles from 1950 to 1984. The last time the club won the Cook Islands FA Cup was in 1984 when they beat Arorangi 6–1. They have achieved the Double three times in 1950, 1975 and 1984

Titles
Cook Islands Round Cup: 14
1950, 1971, 1972, 1973, 1974, 1975, 1976, 1977, 1978, 1979, 1981, 1982, 1983, 1984

Cook Islands Cup: 3
1950, 1979, 1984

Current squad
Squad for the 2021

References

Football clubs in the Cook Islands